Yenipazar District is a district of Bilecik Province of Turkey. Its seat is the town Yenipazar. Its area is 273 km2, and its population is 2,787 (2021). Its neighbors are Taraklı from the north, Göynük from north-east, Mihalgazi and Sarıcakaya from south-east, İnhisar from south and Gölpazarı from west.

Composition
There is one municipality in Yenipazar District:
 Yenipazar

There are 23 villages in Yenipazar District:

 Aşağıboğaz
 Aşağıçaylı
 Batıbelenören
 Belkese
 Caferler
 Danişment
 Dereköy
 Doğubelenören
 Esenköy
 Karahasanlar
 Katran
 Kavacık
 Kösüre
 Kükürt
 Kuşça
 Nasuhlar
 Selim
 Sorguncukahiler
 Tohumlar
 Ulucak
 Yukarıboğaz
 Yukarıçaylı
 Yumaklı

References

Districts of Bilecik Province